Under Your Spell is a 1936 American film.

Under Your Spell may also refer to:

Under Your Spell, an album by Tinga Stewart
Under Your Spell, an album by The Birthday Massacre
"Under Your Spell", a song by Cliff Richard from the album Always Guaranteed
"Under Your Spell", a 1988 song by Candi & The Backbeat
"Under Your Spell", a 1991 song by Mark Shaw
"Under Your Spell", a 1993 song by Ronny Jordan
"Under Your Spell", a 2009 song by Desire
"Under Your Spell", a song from the Buffy the Vampire Slayer episode "Once More, with Feeling"

See also
"Under Your Spell Again", a song by Buck Owens